A polliwog is a tadpole, the offspring of an amphibian.

Polliwog or pollywog may also refer to:
 Binyah Binyah Polliwog, a character on the children's television series Gullah Gullah Island
 Pollywog, a sailor who has not crossed the Equator, in the Line-crossing ceremony initiation rite
 "The Pollywogg", a song by Captain Bogg and Salty from Bedtime Stories For Pirates
 Polliwog Park, in Manhattan Beach, California